Fernando Ortiz may refer to:

Fernando Ortiz Fernández (1881–1969), Cuban essayist, anthropologist, ethnomusicologist and scholar 
Fernando Ortiz (athlete) (1905–?), Mexican Olympic sprinter
Fernando Ortiz Arana (born 1944), Mexican politician
Fernando Ortiz (footballer, born 1977), Argentine football player
Fernando Ortiz (footballer, born 1992), Mexican football player
Fernando Ortíz (sailor) (1923–2012), Mexican Olympic sailor